Yannick Noah was the defending champion but lost in the semifinals to Eliot Teltscher.

José Higueras won the singles title of the 1983 Congoleum Classic tennis tournament in the final 6–4, 6–2 against Teltscher.

Seeds

Draw

Finals

Top half

Section 1

Section 2

Bottom half

Section 3

Section 4

References
 1983 Congoleum Classic Draw - Men's Singles

Congoleum Classic - Singles